Kazuo Kanda (born 29 March 1930) is a Japanese former rower. He competed in the men's coxed four event at the 1952 Summer Olympics.

References

External links
 

1930 births
Possibly living people
Japanese male rowers
Olympic rowers of Japan
Rowers at the 1952 Summer Olympics
Place of birth missing (living people)